Vence is a commune set in the hills of the Alpes Maritimes department in the Provence-Alpes-Côte d'Azur region in southeastern France, north of Nice and Antibes.

Ecclesiastical history
The first known Bishop of Vence is Severus, bishop in 439 and perhaps as early as 419.

Among others are: Veranus, son of St. Eucherius, Archbishop of Lyon and a monk of Lérins, bishop before 451 and at least until 465; St. Lambert, first a Benedictine monk (died 1154); Cardinal Alessandro Farnese (1505–11).

Antoine Godeau, Bishop of Grasse, was named Bishop of Vence in 1638; the Holy See wished to unite the two dioceses. Meeting with opposition from the chapter and the clergy of Vence Godeau left Grasse in 1653, to remain Bishop of Vence, which see he held until 1672.

The diocese of Nice now unites the three former Dioceses of Nice, Grasse and Vence.

Population

Sights
Within the historic village, a medieval walled village, there are numerous interesting sights and monuments. The Peyra Gate was remodelled in 1810. The fountain was rebuilt in 1822 replacing an older one dating from 1578. Nearby is an ash tree, donated by François I and planted in 1538. The castle is today the Fondation Émile Hugues, a modern and contemporary art museum. The cathedral was built in the 4th century on the site of a Roman temple. The stone of the western façade dates from 239. Another, on the right, was engraved in December 220. Other stones in the external walls represent funerary dedications. Also on the western side of the church, the Pierre du Tauroble evokes the cult of Cybele  and also the Great mother of the Gods of Mount Ida. A chapel in the cathedral has a mosaic by Marc Chagall, dated 1979. The rue des Portiques is a section of the old Roman road.

The town has a small chapel, up above the Cité Historique Chapelle du Rosaire (1948, completed in 1951), decorated with stained glass and other fittings by Henri Matisse, who owned a home in the village towards the end of his life.

Vence is famous for its spring water, which can be collected from numerous fountains in the town.

Education

Nursery schools

Primary schools

Grammar school

High school

See also
 Vence Cathedral
 Saint-Paul-de-Vence
 Communes of the Alpes-Maritimes department

References

External links

 
 Pictures of Vence Cathedral: , 
 French language Wikipedia Article about Henri Calet
 French language Wikipedia Article about Émile Delavenay

Communes of Alpes-Maritimes
Alpes-Maritimes communes articles needing translation from French Wikipedia
Henri Matisse